Dashtabad may refer to:
 Dashtabad, Hamadan
 Dashtabad-e Olya, Ilam Province
 Dashtabad-e Sofla, Ilam Province
 Dashtabad, Fahraj, Kerman Province
 Dashtabad, Narmashir, Kerman Province
 Dashtabad, Yazd